Sikuijivitteq, also known as Kangerdlugsuatsiak, is a fjord of the King Frederick VI Coast in the Kujalleq municipality, southeastern Greenland. The name 'Mogens Heinesen' is based on Magnus Heinason, a 16th-century Faroese naval hero.

Geography
Sikuijivitteq is located south of Timmiarmiut Fjord (Timmiarmiit Kangertivat); to the east it opens into the North Atlantic Ocean. Ikermiit Island is located off the fjord's mouth.

Mountains
There are high mountains rising on both sides of the fjord, becoming especially craggy towards the inner side.

See also
List of fjords of Greenland

References

External links
Greenland Pilot - Danish Geodata Agency
Field relationship of high-grade Neo- to Mesoarchaean rocks of South-East Greenland: Tectonometamorphic and magmatic evolution

Fjords of Greenland